Hari Singh (born 1961) is a former marathon runner from India.

He ran at the 1987 World Championships in Athletics and finished in 42nd among 67 entrants in the men's marathon with a time of 2:34:20.

He also competed at the 1998 IAAF World Half Marathon Championships, finishing in 123rd with a time of 1:10:58.

References

1961 births
Living people
Athletes from Rajasthan
Rajasthani people
Indian male marathon runners
Indian male long-distance runners
Date of birth missing (living people)
World Athletics Championships athletes for India